Ouédraogo (also spelled Wedraogo or Ouidiraogo) was the son of Yennenga and progenitor of the Mossi Kingdoms. He founded the kingdom of Tenkodogo. His three sons were Rawa, Diaba Lompo, and Zoungourana.

References

13th-century Burkinabé people
City founders